Veronica V. Jones is a commercial digital illustrator specializing in the fantasy and science fiction genres. She began her professional illustration career in 1997, and has since worked on a wide variety of role-playing, collectible card game and fantasy literature publications.

Select published works 
 Book covers, Spycraft 1.0 / Shadowforce Archer RPG
 Card illustrations, Legend of the Five Rings CCG
 Card illustrations, A Game of Thrones CCG
 Interior illustrations, Little Fears
 Cover and interior illustrations, Little Fears Nightmare Edition

References

External links
Official Web Site (Fantasy Artwork)
Official Web Site (YA/MG Book Illustration)
Pen & Paper RPG Database listing for Veronica V. Jones 

American speculative fiction artists
Fantasy artists
Game artists
Living people
Role-playing game artists
Science fiction artists
Year of birth missing (living people)